Parichay (English: Introduction) (also known as Parichay — Nayee Zindagi Kay Sapno Ka) is an Indian soap opera that aired on Colors TV from 9 August 2011 to 15 March 2013. The show is produced by Ekta Kapoor and Shobha Kapoor under their banner Balaji Telefilms.

Plot
The story revolves around a fallen hero, Kunal Chopra, who has lost his enthusiasm because of his failure, and is leading a lackadaisical life before he found true love in   his wife Siddhi Chopra after  which he started living following  his dreams got their directions.

Cast

Main
 Samir Soni  as Kunal Chopra, Siddhi's husband, twins Anand's father, Veena and Raj's eldest son, Anand, Gaurav and Raveena's eldest brother 
 Keerti Nagpure as Siddhi Kunal Chopra née Malik, Kunal's wife, twins Anand's mother, Kapil and Shilpa's sister

Recurring
 Apurva Jyotir as Anand Chopra: Siddhi and Kunal's twin son 
 Anmol Jyotir as Anand Chopra, Siddhi and Kunal's twin son
 Ayaz Khan as Gaurav Chopra, Kunal's younger brother, Seema's husband, Anokhi and Ishani's father 
 Arti Singh as Seema Gaurav Chopra née Garewal, Vikram's elder sister, Gaurav's wife, Anokhi and Ishani's mother
  Prerna Wanvari as Raveena Vikram Garewal née Chopra, Kunal's younger sister, Vikram's wife 
 Tapeshwari Sharma as Anokhi Chopra, Seema and Gaurav's elder daughter
 Megha Israni as Young Anokhi Chopra 
 Richa Srivastava as Ishani Chopra, Seema and Gaurav's younger daughter
 Saurabh Raj Jain as Anand Chopra, Kunal's second younger brother, Siddhi's ex-fiancé/lover (deceased)
 Vivek Mishra as Raj Chopra: Veena's husband, Kunal, Gaurav, Anand and Raveena's father 
 Alka Amin as Veena Chopra, Raj's wife, Kunal, Gaurav, Anand and Raveena's mother
 Deepak Sandhu as Vikram Garewal: Seema's younger brother, Raveena's husband
 Amit Singh Thakur as Sudhanshu Garewal: Seema and Vikram's father 
 Madhurima Tuli / Mona Vasu / Sonia Singh as Richa Thakral: Kunal's ex-girlfriend/fiancée 
 Abhay Bhargava as Advocate D.K. Thakral: Kunal's employer, Richa and Rohit's father
 Karam Rajpal as Rohit Thakral: Richa's younger brother, Raveena's former lover
 Aruna Irani as Sulekha Diwan 
 Mahip Marwaha as Lalit Dhawan
 Mahesh Shetty as Abhay Diwan 
 Khushboo Shroff as Shilpa Malik: Siddhi's younger sister 
 Mukesh Solanki as Kapil Malik: Siddhi's elder brother 
 Nitin Sahrawat as Super Star Aman Kumar 
 Gautam Rode as Vineet Saxena: Richa's ex-fiancé
 Mohit Sehgal as Aarav: Siddhi's friend
 Sidharth Shukla as Shiv
 Drashti Dhami as Madhu
 Tejasswi Prakash as Dhara

Production
During early January 2013, lead Keerti Nagpure met with a severe accident with injuries in face and could not shoot for the series for few days. However, in late January 2013, she returned.

The show ended on 15 March 2013 due to decrease in TRP after the time change from 9:30pm to 10:30pm (IST).

Awards
 Golden Petal Awards 2011 - Favourite Jodi - Samir Soni and Keerti Nagpure
 Golden Petal Awards 2011 - Favourite Naya Sadasya - Samir Soni
 Lions Gold Awards 2012 - Best Actor in Lead Role - Samir Soni
 Golden Petal Awards 2012- Most LokPriya Family
 Golden Petal Awards 2012- Most Jaanbaaz Personality - Samir Soni
 11th Indian Telly Awards - Best Actor in a Lead Role - Samir Soni
 5th Boroplus Gold Awards - Best Actor (Critics) - Samir Soni
 12th Indian Television Academy Awards - Best Actor (Popular)'' - Samir Soni

References

External links
Official webpage at Colorstv.in

Balaji Telefilms television series
Indian reality television series
Colors TV original programming
2011 Indian television series debuts
2013 Indian television series endings
Indian television soap operas